Jim Shelley is a British television and entertainment critic.

From 1993 to 2000, Shelley wrote as a freelance writer for The Guardians supplemental section The Guide. His television criticism work initially appeared as a column under the alias of "Tapehead". These were considered surrealistic reviews of current television, similar to the work of Victor Lewis-Smith and Charlie Brooker. He later work specifically on soap operas under "Soaphead". He also wrote for The Mail on Sunday "Night on Day" section on soaps.

In 2001, with the departure of Charlie Catchpole from the Daily Mirror to the Daily Express, Shelley became the new television critic for the Mirror. He continued to write for the Mirror under its "Shelley Vision" column until 2011. Since 2013, he writes as a television review columnist for the Daily Mail.

In addition, Shelley has written for magazines such as Esquire magazine, Details and BLITZ and was featured in NME.

His collection of Tapehead columns was published as "Interference: Tapehead vs. Television" by Atlantic Books in 2001.

References

British television critics
Year of birth missing (living people)
Living people